Roberto Longo (born 3 December 1984, in Soave) is a retired Italian professional road racing cyclist who last rode for .

Career
During Stage 4 of the  2007 Eneco Tour Longo was part of the early breakaway which held a gap of seven minutes at one point, unfortunately the break was caught with 30 kilometres to go and Longo finished in 145 position. The 2007 Tour de Pologne started with a three kilometre Team time trial where  went out early and fast beating the rain and the other teams to win the stage. Although Longo's teammate Fabio Baldato was thought to have crossed the line first Longo wore the yellow leaders jersey into stage 2 where he then lost it to Graeme Brown. Longo took his only top 10 in a stage of a tour at the 2008 Tour of Turkey where in stage 7 he sprinted to ninth after leading out team sprinter David Loosli to fourth position.

Major results
Sources:
2006
 1st Piccola Coppa Agostoni
 3rd Trofeo Città di Brescia
 5th Circuito del Porto
2007
 1st Stage 1 (TTT) Tour de Pologne
 3rd Trofeo Lindo e Sano

References

External links

Italian male cyclists
1984 births
Living people
Cyclists from the Province of Verona
20th-century Italian people
21st-century Italian people